Gille dynasty was a powerful royal house or dynasty which ruled the Kingdom of Norway during the 12th century.  It is very unlikely that the rulers ever referred to the Gille dynasty which is a term coined by modern historians. The term "Gille" is probably derived from the Middle Irish Gaelic Gilla Críst, i.e. servant of Christ.

King Harald IV of Norway started the Gille (or Gylle dynasty), a putative cadet branch of the Hardrada dynasty (and by extension the Fairhair) dynasty. Harald Gille arrived in Norway from Ireland or the Hebrides and claimed to be the natural son of King Magnus Barefoot whose reign was marked by aggressive military campaigns and conquest, particularly in the Norse-dominated parts of the British Isles.  From historical sources, his claim seems to have been based largely upon stories told by his mother and her family during his youth. 

Approximately from the accession of Harald to the throne, the civil war era in Norway  (Borgerkrigstida)  lasted from 1130 to 1240. His descendants would expand the influence, wealth and power of the dynasty. The royal house replaced the Hardrada dynasty in 1135, and was again replaced by scion of the Hardrada dynasty in 1162. The line was briefly restored under Inge II Baardson, a cognatic descendant of the dynasty, but was replaced again by the House of Sverre in 1217.

List of kings and rival kings 
The rulers within the royal house would often have a rival who opposed the established king's right to rule the realm and dominions. Here is a list of the rulers during the period the house held the power in Norway:

Harald Gille : 1130–1136
Sigurd II of Norway Sigurd Munn : 1136–1155
Eystein II of Norway (Øystein Haraldsson) : 1142–1157
Inge I of Norway Inge the Hunchback (Inge Krokrygg) : 1136–1161
Haakon II of Norway Haakon Broadshoulder (Håkon Herdebreid) : 1157–1162
Sigurd Markusfostre : 1162–1163, rival king
Eystein Meyla Eystein the Maiden (Øystein Møyla) : 1174–1177, rival king
Jon Kuvlung : 1185–1188, rival king
Inge II of Norway (Inge Bårdsson) : 1204–1217

See also
Civil war era in Norway

References

 Gille
 
Norwegian monarchy
Norwegian people of Irish descent